British singer John Newman has released two studio albums, 20 singles (excluding five as a featured artist) and an EP.

In May 2012 John Newman featured on Rudimental's single "Feel the Love". The single peaked at number one on the UK Singles Chart in early June 2012 and was also a top 5 hit in Australia, Belgium, the Netherlands and New Zealand. The song was later certified 2× Platinum by the Australian Recording Industry Association. In November 2012 he featured on Rudimental's follow-up single, "Not Giving In", which peaked at number 14 on the UK Singles Chart. It was also a top 20 hit in Australia and New Zealand. Tribute, Newman's debut studio album, was released in October 2013, the album peaked at number one on the UK Albums Chart. The album includes the singles "Love Me Again", "Cheating", "Losing Sleep" and "Out of My Head". In September 2014 he featured on Calvin Harris' single "Blame", which peaked at number one on the UK Singles Chart. It also topped the charts in Finland, the Netherlands, Norway and Sweden, while charting within the top five in Austria, Germany, Ireland and Italy, and the top ten in Australia, Denmark, France, New Zealand and Spain. Revolve, Newman's second studio album, was released in October 2015, the album peaked at number three on the UK Albums Chart. The album includes the singles "Come and Get It" and "Tiring Game". In April 2016 he featured on Sigala single "Give Me Your Love" the song also features Nile Rodgers, the song peaked at number nine on the UK Singles Chart.

Standalone single releases include "Olé", "Fire in Me", "Feelings", "Stand by Me" and "High on You".

Studio albums

Extended plays

Singles

As lead artist

As featured artist

Music videos

Guest appearances

Songwriting credits

Notes

References

Discographies of British artists